Merom is a town in Gill Township, Sullivan County, Indiana, United States. The population was 228 at the 2010 census. It is part of the Terre Haute Metropolitan Statistical Area. Nearby is Hallador Energy's Merom Generating Station.

History
The town's name commemorates the Battle of the Waters of Merom in the Hebrew Bible. The Merom post office has been in operation since 1818.

Geography
Merom is located at  (39.056950, -87.566573).

The Bluff Park in Merom is the site of the type locality of the Merom Sandstone.

Demographics

2010 census
As of the census of 2010, there were 228 people, 99 households, and 59 families living in the town. The racial makeup of the town was 100.0% White. Hispanic or Latino of any race were 0.4% of the population.

There were 99 households, of which 36.4% had children under the age of 18 living with them, 42.4% were married couples living together, 13.1% had a female householder with no husband present, 4.0% had a male householder with no wife present, and 40.4% were non-families. 37.4% of all households were made up of individuals, and 20.2% had someone living alone who was 65 years of age or older. The average household size was 2.30 and the average family size was 2.97.

The median age in the town was 39.4 years. 30.3% of residents were under the age of 18; 4.8% were between the ages of 18 and 24; 21.5% were from 25 to 44; 27.1% were from 45 to 64; and 16.2% were 65 years of age or older. The gender makeup of the town was 50.4% male and 49.6% female.

2000 census
As of the census of 2000, there were 294 people, 108 households, and 81 families living in the town. The racial makeup of the town was 98.30% White, 0.68% African American, and 1.02% from two or more races. Hispanic or Latino of any race were 0.68% of the population.

There were 108 households, out of which 43.5% had children under the age of 18 living with them, 60.2% were married couples living together, 9.3% had a female householder with no husband present, and 25.0% were non-families. 21.3% of all households were made up of individuals, and 11.1% had someone living alone who was 65 years of age or older. The average household size was 2.72 and the average family size was 3.12.

In the town, the population was spread out, with 32.0% under the age of 18, 3.4% from 18 to 24, 32.0% from 25 to 44, 19.0% from 45 to 64, and 13.6% who were 65 years of age or older. The median age was 36 years. For every 100 females, there were 101.4 males. For every 100 females age 18 and over, there were 86.9 males.

The median income for a household in the town was $31,528, and the median income for a family was $33,333. Males had a median income of $30,250 versus $20,750 for females. The per capita income for the town was $13,087. About 13.5% of families and 14.5% of the population were below the poverty line, including 11.4% of those under the age of eighteen and 3.6% of those 65 or over.

Education
Merom has a public library, a branch of the Sullivan County Public Library.

The grand opening of the Merom – Gill Township Carnegie Library was on Sep. 1, 1918. The two-story structure has beautiful oak woodwork and paintings by local artist Will Turman. The Merom Library became a part of the Sullivan County Public Library system on Dec. 28, 1967. Locals believe that Merom is the smallest town in the U.S. with a Carnegie-built library.

Arts and culture
Merom's two main attractions are the Bluff Park overlooking the Wabash River and the farm fields of Illinois.

References

External links
 Town website

Towns in Sullivan County, Indiana
Terre Haute metropolitan area